Dennis Veraldi was the interim CEO of the Port Authority of Allegheny County serving metropolitan Pittsburgh, Pennsylvania from September 13, 2005 until June 11, 2006.  He was formerly the longtime CEO of Pittsburgh-based Eckert Seamans lawfirm.

References

Port Authority of Allegheny County executives
Living people
Year of birth missing (living people)